The Women's doubles event at the 2010 Commonwealth Games was held at the Siri Fort Sports Complex, New Delhi from 9 October to 13 October.

Finals

References

Squash at the 2010 Commonwealth Games
Common